A special election was held in  on October 10, 1809, to fill a vacancy left by the resignation of Representative Benjamin Say (DR) in June of that year. Say himself had been elected in a special election the previous year.  He thus spent a little under a year in Congress, serving in the second session of the 10th Congress and the first session of the 11th Congress.

Election results

Seybert took his seat November 27, 1809, at the start of the second session of the 11th Congress

See also
List of special elections to the United States House of Representatives

References

Pennsylvania 1809 01
Pennsylvania 1809 01
1809 01
Pennsylvania 01
United States House of Representatives 01
United States House of Representatives 1809 01